The green-billed toucan (Ramphastos dicolorus), or red-breasted toucan, is a near-passerine bird in the family Ramphastidae, the toucans, toucanets, and aracaris. It is found in Argentina, Brazil, and Paraguay.

Taxonomy and systematics

The green-billed toucan is sister to the channel-billed toucan (R. vitellinus) and Choco toucan (R. brevis). It is monotypic.

Description

The sexes are alike though the female's bill is shorter than the male's. Their bill is mostly green to green-yellow, with a vertical black line at its base, red and ivory tomial "teeth", and some green striations on the maxilla. Their crown, nape, upperparts, and tail are black but for red uppertail coverts. Their face is yellow with bare red, blue, and yellow-green skin around the eye. Their throat and breast are yellow with a red area within the lower breast. Their belly and undertail coverts are red and their flanks black.

Distribution and habitat

The green-billed toucan is found from Tocantins, Minas Gerais, and Espírito Santo
in south-central, east-central, and southeastern Brazil south through eastern Paraguay and into northern Argentina's Formosa, Chaco, Corrientes, and Misiones provinces. It primarily inhabits subtropical and tropical, sub-montane and montane forest, but also scrublands, savanna with trees, and plantations.

Behavior

Movement

In the southern part of its range the green-billed toucan moves to lower elevations in the austral winter. After breeding some move from natural forest into plantations.

Feeding

The green-billed toucan feeds mostly on fruits, of both native and introduced plants as well as green coffee beans and fruit in orchards. To a lesser extent it also feeds on insects and small birds. It usually forages in pairs and small groups but 20 or more may gather at times. It usually forages in the forest canopy but will pick up fallen fruit from the ground.

Breeding

The green-billed toucan breeds between October and February in the southern part of its range and from January to June in the north. Pairs are territorial. Males allopreen and courtship-feed females. The species nests in cavities in both living and dead trees, either those made by natural decay or excavated by woodpeckers, and will enlarge both the entrance hole and the cavity if needed. Typically the bottom of the cavity has a layer of ejested seeds. The clutch size is two to four eggs. Both adults incubate the eggs and both provision nestlings. The incubation period is about 16 to 19 days and fledging occurs 40 to 50 days after hatch.

Vocal and non-vocal sounds

The green-billed toucan is one of the "croaker" group of toucans. Its song is a "loud, raucous 'WRèh' or 'niuh'." Other vocalizations are a "long series of noisy honking 'grrekk' notes" and "low 'ek', 'zneep', [and] growl-like begging". It also claps its bill and rattles its tongue in the bill.

Status

The IUCN originally assessed the green-billed toucan as Near Threatened but since 2004 has rated it as being of Least Concern. It has a very large range, but its population size is not known and is believed to be decreasing. No immediate threats have been identified. It is thought to be "reasonably common in general." It occurs in several protected areas but outside them is sometimes hunted or persecuted for taking orchard fruit.

References

External links

Video in natural habitat on YouTube 

green-billed toucan
Birds of the Atlantic Forest
green-billed toucan
Taxa named by Carl Linnaeus